Rough Hollow is a valley in McDonald County in the U.S. state of Missouri.

Rough Hollow was named for the broken terrain of the valley.

References

Valleys of McDonald County, Missouri
Valleys of Missouri